Souls in Pawn is a 1917 American silent spy-drama film directed by Henry King and starring Gail Kane. Based on a story by Jules Furthman, it was released by Mutual Film.

Plot
As described in a film magazine review, Sebastian Dore (Dearholt) is mysteriously murdered in front of his home, and his beautiful wife Liane (Kane) vows revenge on the murderer. To this end she becomes a German spy for Karl, Prince von Kondermarck (MacLean), but the two fall in love. At the outbreak of war Karl is called to Germany, and Liane opens her home to wounded French soldiers. She accidentally learns that Karl is the murderer of her husband and plans to turn him over to the police. Before he leaves, Karl produces letters showing that Sebastian had betrayed his sister, and explains that Sebastian was accidentally shot in a struggle. Liane and Karl escape together on his yacht.

Cast
Gail Kane - Liane Dore
Douglas MacLean - Karl, Prince von Kondermarck
Robert Klein - Baron Arnold von Pllnitz/The Comte
Frank Rickert - De Courcey
Edward Peil, Sr. - Etienne Jaccard
Ashton Dearholt - Sebastian Dore
Ruth Everdale - Marie, Liane's Child

References

External links
 
 

1917 films
American silent feature films
Lost American films
Films directed by Henry King
1910s spy drama films
Films with screenplays by Jules Furthman
American black-and-white films
American Film Company films
Mutual Film films
American spy drama films
1917 drama films
1917 lost films
1910s American films
Silent American drama films